The Machupo River is a river in Beni Department, Bolivia, a tributary of the Amazon. It rises in the foothills of the Andes and flows east and northeast into the Guaporé River (Rio Itenez) just to the east of Forte Principe da Beira.

References

External links
 
 

 

Rivers of Beni Department